Longing may refer to:

Music
 Longing (Bell Witch album) (2012)
 Longing (Dusty Springfield album), an unreleased 1974 album
 "Longing" (song), a 1994 song by X Japan
 "Longing", a song by Gackt from Dirge of Cerberus: Final Fantasy VII Original Soundtrack
 "Longing", a song by Helloween from Chameleon
 "The Longing", a song by Imelda May from Life Love Flesh Blood
"Longing", a composition for viola and piano by Alfred Moffat
"Longing", a composition for piano by Josef Suk

Other uses 
 Longing (emotion) or desire
 Cape Longing, a headland in Antarctica
 Longing (play), a 2013 play by William Boyd
 The Longing, a 2020 video game.
  The Longing (film), a 2002 film.
 Longing (2006 film), a German film
 Longing (2017 film), an Israeli film

See also 
 Long (disambiguation)
 Sehnsucht (disambiguation)